Longendale Urban District (also known as Longdendale Urban District) was, from 1936 to 1974, a local government district in the administrative county of Cheshire, England. It encompassed parts of Broadbottom, Hattersley, Hollingworth, Matley and Mottram in Longdendale, all of which form part of the non-statutory Longdendale Valley.

The district covered an area close to Cheshire's northeastern boundary with Derbyshire and was bound (from north to west) by Municipal Borough of Mossley, Municipal Borough of Stalybridge, Municipal Borough of Dukinfield and Municipal Borough of Hyde. Tintwistle Rural District, from which Longendale exchanged territory with in 1936, lay to the east.

The Urban District was created by the Local Government Act 1894. In 1974 Longendale Urban District was abolished by the Local Government Act 1972 and its former area transferred to Greater Manchester to form part of the Metropolitan Borough of Tameside.

See also
Longdendale Bypass

References
A vision of Longdendale UD, visionofbritain.org.uk. URL accessed 1 March 2008.

Districts of England abolished by the Local Government Act 1972
History of Cheshire
History of Tameside
Local government in Tameside
Urban districts of England